Reindeer Lake Aerodrome  is located on a small unnamed island south-west of Weaver Island and north of Burton Island in Reindeer Lake, Saskatchewan, Canada.

See also 
 List of airports in Saskatchewan

References 

Registered aerodromes in Saskatchewan